Henry Griffin (1786 – 5 April 1866) was an eminent Irish Anglican bishop in the mid 19th century.

He was born in 1786 in Wexford and educated at Trinity College, Dublin. He was the incumbent at Clonfeacle from 1829 until 1854 when he was consecrated Bishop of Limerick, Ardfert and Aghadoe. He died in post on 5 April 1866. He had become a Doctor of Divinity (DD).

References

1786 births
1866 deaths
Christian clergy from County Wexford
Fellows of Trinity College Dublin
19th-century Anglican bishops in Ireland
Bishops of Limerick, Ardfert and Aghadoe
Diocese of Limerick, Ardfert and Aghadoe